A Bernoulli grip uses airflow to adhere to an object without physical contact. Such grippers rely on the Bernoulli airflow principle. A high velocity airstream has a low static pressure. With careful design the pressure in the high velocity airstream can be lower than atmospheric pressure. This can cause a net force on the object in the direction normal to the side with lower local pressure. A Bernoulli gripper takes advantage of this by maintaining a positive pressure at the gripper face compared to the ambient pressure, while maintaining an air gap between the gripper and the object being held.

Applications
Commercially available Bernoulli grips are commonly used to handle rigid sheet like material such as silicon wafers in circuit board manufacturing, or photovoltaic cell components. Since the grip is contactless, this form of gripping lends itself to handling sterile material to prevent chemical and/or biological contamination. Research has been done into using Bernoulli grippers to transport sample sheet foodstuffs in a food processing context, although this work found difficulties as the flexible foods would vibrate against the gripper, deforming and alternately blocking the gripper or and being blown away from the airway.
The Bernoulli grip is also being investigated as a non-contact adhesion mechanism for wall climbing robots.

References

Aerodynamics
Fluid dynamics